Prasansana Jayamanne (born 17 September 1994) is a Sri Lankan cricketer. He made his Twenty20 debut for Negombo Cricket Club in the 2017–18 SLC Twenty20 Tournament on 24 February 2018. He made his List A debut for Negombo Cricket Club in the 2017–18 Premier Limited Overs Tournament on 10 March 2018. He was the leading run-scorer for Negombo Cricket Club in the 2018–19 Premier League Tournament, with 648 runs in seven matches.

References

External links
 

1994 births
Living people
Sri Lankan cricketers
Negombo Cricket Club cricketers
Place of birth missing (living people)